Nadowli is a small town and is the capital of Nadowli district, a district in the Upper West Region of north Ghana.
 
Other well-known cities around Nadowli are Tangasia, which has the most popular market in the district and Cherekpong.

References

Populated places in the Upper West Region